NEMA contact ratings are how much current at a rated voltage a relay or other pilot device can switch. The current rating of smaller NEMA contactors or their auxiliaries are defined by NEMA ICS 5: Industrial Control and Systems, Control Circuit and Pilot Devices  standard. The nomenclature is a letter followed by a three-digit number, the letter designates the current rating of the contacts and the current type (i.e., AC or DC) and the number designates the maximum voltage design values.

AC Contact Ratings

DC Contact Ratings

See also 
 Utilization categories

References 

Relays
NEMA standards